The Autopista AP-51 (also known as Autopista Ávila - Villacastín and Conexión Ávila) is an autopista in the community of Castile and León, Spain. It runs parallel to the N-110. As a toll road, it is operated by the Abertis Group.

Upon reaching Ávila, the highway then runs for a further  as an autovía, the A-51, forming a partial beltway around the north of Ávila and connecting with the Autovía A-50.

References

Autopistas and autovías in Spain
Transport in Castile and León